Mohamed Haythem Abid (born 17 July 1985) is a retired professional Tunisian tennis player. 

Representing his country internationally, he played in thirty-seven Davis Cup ties, and won a silver medal at the 2013 Mediterranean Games partnering with Malek Jaziri.

As a junior, Abid reached as high as No. 19 in the world, and spent four years at the Bruguera Academy in Barcelona, Spain. He defeated future world No. 5 Kevin Anderson at the 2003 African Closed Junior Championship.

References

External links
 
 

1985 births
Living people
Tunisian male tennis players
Mediterranean Games silver medalists for Tunisia
Competitors at the 2013 Mediterranean Games
Mediterranean Games medalists in tennis
African Games medalists in tennis
African Games silver medalists for Tunisia
Competitors at the 2007 All-Africa Games
UCLA Bruins men's tennis players
21st-century Tunisian people